The China men's national artistic gymnastics team represents China in FIG international competitions.

History 

 1958 World Championships

 1962 World Championships

 1979 World Championships

 1981 World Championships

 1983 World Championships

 1984 Summer Olympics

 1985 World Championships

 1987 World Championships

 1988 Summer Olympics

 1989 World Championships

 1991 World Championships

 1992 World Championships

 1992 Summer Olympics

 1993 World Championships

 1994 World Championships

 1995 World Championships

 1996 World Championships

 1996 Summer Olympics

 1997 World Championships

 1999 World Championships

 2000 Summer Olympics

 2001 World Championships

 2002 World Championships

 2003 World Championships

 2004 Summer Olympics

 2005 World Championships

 2006 World Championships

 2007 World Championships

 2008 Summer Olympics

 2009 World Championships

 2010 World Championships

 2011 World Championships

 2012 Summer Olympics

 2013 World Championships

 2014 World Championships

 2015 World Championships

 2016 Summer Olympics

 2017 World Championships

 2018 World Championships

 2019 World Championships

 2020 Summer Olympics

 2021 World Championships

 2022 World Championships

Current Squads

Team Competition Results

Olympic Games 
 1896 through 1984 — did not participate
 1984 —  silver medal
Li Ning, Li Xiaoping, Li Yuejiu, Lou Yun, Tong Fei, Xu Zhiqiang
 1988 — 4th place
Wang Chongsheng, Lou Yun, Xu Zhiqiang, Guo Linxian, Li Chunyang, Li Ning
 1992 —  silver medal
Guo Linyao, Li Chunyang, Li Dashuang, Li Ge, Li Jing, Li Xiaoshuang
 1996 —  silver medal
Fan Bin, Fan Hongbin, Huang Huadong, Huang Liping, Li Xiaoshuang, Shen Jian, Zhang Jinjing
 2000 —  gold medal
Huang Xu, Li Xiaopeng, Xiao Junfeng, Xing Aowei, Yang Wei, Zheng Lihui
 2004 — 5th place
Huang Xu, Li Xiaopeng, Teng Haibin, Xiao Qin, Xing Aowei, Yang Wei
 2008 —  gold medal
Huang Xu, Chen Yibing, Li Xiaopeng, Xiao Qin, Yang Wei, Zou Kai
 2012 —  gold medal
Chen Yibing, Feng Zhe, Guo Weiyang, Zhang Chenglong, Zou Kai
 2016 —  bronze medal
Deng Shudi, Lin Chaopan, Liu Yang, You Hao, Zhang Chenglong
 2020 —  bronze medal
Lin Chaopan, Sun Wei, Xiao Ruoteng, Zou Jingyuan

World Championships 

 1903 through 1954 — did not participate
 1958 — 11th place
Pao Naichen, Wu Shuten, Yu Lifeng, Hsu Jenchen, Yang Chenmin, Zhao Tenin
 1962 — 4th place
Yu Lifeng, Yeh Yita, Chang Chen, Liao Juntien, Hsu Taiming, Feng Taichun
 1966 through 1978 — did not participate
 1979 — 5th place
Huang Yubin, Cai Huanzong, Li Yuejiu, Tong Fei, Peng Yaping, Xiong Songliang
 1981 —  bronze medal
Tong Fei, Li Ning, Li Xiaoping, Huang Yubin, Peng Yaping, Li Yuejiu
 1983 —  gold medal
Tong Fei, Li Ning, Lou Yun, Xu Zhiqiang, Li Xiaoping, Li Yuejiu
 1985 —  silver medal
Li Ning, Xu Zhiqiang, Tong Fei, Lou Yun, Yang Yueshan, Zou Limin
 1987 —  silver medal
Xu Zhiqiang, Lou Yun, Wang Chongsheng, Guo Linxiang, Li Chunyang, Li Ning
 1989 —  bronze medal
Li Chunyang, Li Jing, Ma Zheng, Li Ge, Guo Linxiang, Wang Chongsheng,
 1991 —  silver medal
Li Jing, Li Chunyang, Huang Huadong, Guo Linyao, Li Xiaoshuang, Li Ge
 1994 —  gold medal
Fan Hongbin, Guo Linyao, Huang Huadong, Huang Liping, Li Dashuang, Li Xiaoshuang, Li Jing
 1995 —  gold medal
Fan Bin, Huang Huadong, Huang Liping, Li Xiaoshuang, Zhang Jinjing, Shen Jian, Fan Hongbin
 1997 —  gold medal
Shen Jian, Li Xiaopeng, Huang Xu, Lu Yufu, Xiao Junfeng, Zhang Jinjing
 1999 —  gold medal
Dong Zhen, Huang Xu, Li Xiaopeng, Lu Yufu, Xing Aowei, Yang Wei
 2001 — 5th place
Deng Weiwei, Feng Jing, Li Rongjie, Liu Jinyu, Xiao Qin, Zhang Shangwu
 2003 —  gold medal
Huang Xu, Li Xiaopeng, Teng Haibin, Xiao Qin, Xing Aowei, Yang Wei
 2006 —  gold medal
Chen Yibing, Feng Jing, Liang Fuliang, Xiao Qin, Yang Wei, Zou Kai
 2007 —  gold medal
Chen Yibing, Huang Xu, Liang Fuliang, Xiao Qin, Yang Wei, Zou Kai
 2010 —  gold medal
Chen Yibing, Feng Zhe, Lü Bo, Teng Haibin, Yan Mingyong, Zhang Chenglong
 2011 —  gold medal
Chen Yibing, Feng Zhe, Guo Weiyang, Teng Haibin, Zhang Chenglong, Zou Kai
 2014 —  gold medal
Cheng Ran, Deng Shudi, Lin Chaopan, Liu Yang, You Hao, Zhang Chenglong, Liu Rongbing*
 2015 —  bronze medal
Deng Shudi, Lin Chaopan, Liu Yang, Xiao Ruoteng, You Hao, Zhang Chenglong, Liu Rongbing*
 2018 —  gold medal
Deng Shudi, Lin Chaopan, Sun Wei, Xiao Ruoteng, Zou Jingyuan, Lan Xingyu*
 2019 —  silver medal
Deng Shudi, Lin Chaopan, Sun Wei, Xiao Ruoteng, Zou Jingyuan, You Hao*
 2022 —  gold medal
Sun Wei, Yang Jiaxing, You Hao, Zhang Boheng, Zou Jingyuan, Su Weide*

Asian Games 
 1974 —  gold medal
Cai Huanzong, Liao Runtian, Pan Chenfei, Wu Shoude, Yang Mingming, Zhao Jiawei
 1978 —  gold medal
Cai Huanzong, Huang Yubin, Li Yuejiu, Pan Chenfei, Peng Yaping, Xiong Songliang
 1982 —  gold medal
Huang Yubin, Li Ning, Li Xiaoping, Li Yuejiu, Lou Yun, Tong Fei
 1986 —  gold medal
Guo Linsheng, Li Ning, Lou Yun, Wang Chongsheng, Xu Zhiqiang, Yang Yueshan
 1990 —  gold medal
Guo Linyao, Li Chunyang, Li Ge, Li Jing, Li Xiaoshuang, Qiao Liang
 1994 —  gold medal
Fan Hongbin, Guo Linyao, Huang Huadong, Huang Liping, Li Dashuang, Li Jing, Li Xiaoshuang
 1998 —  gold medal
Huang Xu, Li Xiaopeng, Xing Aowei, Yang Wei, Zhang Jinjing, Zhao Sheng
 2002 —  gold medal
Feng Jing, Huang Xu, Li Xiaopeng, Liang Fuliang, Teng Haibin, Yang Wei
 2006 —  gold medal
Chen Yibing, Feng Jing, Liang Fuliang, Xiao Qin, Yang Wei, Zou Kai
 2010 —  gold medal
Chen Yibing, Feng Zhe, Lü Bo, Teng Haibin, Yan Mingyong, Zhang Chenglong
 2014 —  bronze medal
Huang Xi, Huang Yuguo, Liao Junlin, Wang Peng, Yang Shengchao, Zou Kai
 2018 —  gold medal
Deng Shudi, Lin Chaopan, Sun Wei, Xiao Ruoteng, Zou Jingyuan

Most Decorated Gymnasts

Multiple Medalists

Multiple Gold Medalists

Multiple Individual Medalists

Multiple Individual Gold Medalists

See also 
 China women's national gymnastics team

References 

Gymnastics in China
National men's artistic gymnastics teams
Gymnastics